Mike Karchut (born August 27, 1944) is a German-born American weightlifter. He competed both as a student at Case Western Reserve University, and after graduation. He was an Olympic weightlifter for the United States in 1972 and 1980.

Weightlifting achievements
Olympic Games team member (1972 & 1980)
Senior National Champion (1969-1973, 1975, 1978, 1980)

References

Living people
1944 births
German emigrants to the United States
People with acquired American citizenship
Case Western Reserve University alumni
American male weightlifters
Olympic weightlifters of the United States
Weightlifters at the 1972 Summer Olympics
Pan American Games medalists in weightlifting
Pan American Games gold medalists for the United States
Pan American Games silver medalists for the United States
Weightlifters at the 1971 Pan American Games